Revelation is the third studio album by American country music artist Joe Nichols. It was released on June 29, 2004 by Universal South Records. It produced two singles on the Billboard Hot Country Songs charts: "If Nobody Believed in You" at number 10 and "What's a Guy Gotta Do" at number 4. Also included is "Farewell Party", a cover of a Gene Watson hit single.

Content
"A Singer in a Band" was previously recorded by Mark Wills on his 2003 album And the Crowd Goes Wild. "Don't Ruin It for the Rest of Us" was also recorded the same year by Mark Chesnutt on his album Savin' the Honky Tonk. "If I Ever Get Her Back" was previously recorded by Billy Yates on his 2001 album If I Could Go Back. "No Time to Cry" was recorded by Iris DeMent on her 1993 album My Life, and the title track was originally recorded by Waylon Jennings on his 1972 album Ladies Love Outlaws. In addition, The Oak Ridge Boys later recorded "The Shade" on their 2011 album It's Only Natural.

Track listing

Personnel
Adapted from AllMusic:

 Terry Crisp - steel guitar
 Eric Darken - percussion, vibraphone
 Dan Dugmore - steel guitar
 Stuart Duncan - fiddle
 Shannon Forrest - drums
 Larry Franklin - fiddle
 Wes Hightower - background vocals
 John Hughey - steel guitar
 David Hungate - bass guitar
 Rob Ickes - dobro
 Tim Lauer - Fender Rhodes, organ, pump organ
 Liana Manis - background vocals
 Gordon Mote - piano, synthesizer, synthesizer pads, Wurlitzer
 Brent Rowan - 6-string bass, dobro, 12-string guitar, keyboards, percussion, acoustic guitar, electric guitar, baritone guitar
 Brian Spradlin - electric guitar
 Bryan Sutton - acoustic guitar, hi-string guitar, mandolin
 Tommy White - steel guitar
 Joe Nichols - lead vocals

Chart performance

Weekly charts

Year-end charts

Singles

References

2004 albums
Joe Nichols albums
Show Dog-Universal Music albums
Albums produced by Brent Rowan